Baldim is a Brazilian municipality located in the state of Minas Gerais. The city belongs to the mesoregion Metropolitana de Belo Horizonte and to the microregion of Sete Lagoas.

See also
 List of municipalities in Minas Gerais

References 

Municipalities in Minas Gerais